CFI International Race are a series of three men's one-day cycle race which takes place in India and were each rated by the UCI as 1.2. Each race forms part of the UCI Asia Tour. The first race took place in Mumbai, the second in Jaipur  and the third in Dehli.

Overall winners - Race 1

Overall winners - Race 2

Overall winners - Race 3

References

Cycle races in India